616 film was originally produced by Kodak in 1932 for the Kodak Six-16 camera, along with slightly smaller 620 film for the company's Six-20 size cameras. 

Seventy millimetres wide, the 616 film produced 63.5 mm × 108 mm (2.5" × 4.25") negatives, about the size of postcards and appropriate for making a contact print without the need for an enlarger. It is the same format as that of 116 film but on a slimmer spool, for use in more compact cameras. The format is used in many other cameras such as the Kodak Brownie Junior and the Kodak Target Six-16. The first "6" in the name refers to the number of frames that could originally be exposed on a single roll of film. To avoid customer confusion, the name was not changed when this was increased to eight exposures. From the 1930s on, 616 film became less and less popular in favor of 120 and other film formats—as film resolution became better and the use of enlargers common, the need for a large postcard-size negative became moot. The last 616 film cameras were made in 1948. 

The film was finally discontinued in 1984, while 620 film was discontinued in 1995. However, 120 film, a close relative of 620 film, remains available today to both amateur and professional photographers.

See also 
 Film format
 List of color film systems
 List of still film formats
 List of specialist photographic suppliers

References

External links 
 History of Kodak roll film numbers
 Film Rescue USA and Canada processors of 616 format film

Film formats